USS Volador (IX-59) was a wooden-hulled schooner acquired by the United States Navy in 1942 and after transfer to the United States Army seeing service in the Southwest Pacific Area during World War II as an early command and communications ship. The schooner was designed by William Gardiner and built at Wilmington, California by William Müller and Company in 1926. The yacht was owned by W. L. Valentine, a California yachtsman and Commodore of the California Yacht Club in 1931.

Yacht Volador
The yacht was designed by William Gardiner and built in 1926 for W. L. Valentine, California yachtsman and Commodore of the California Yacht Club, by William Müller and Company in 1926.

In June 1927 the yacht sailed to Alaska with Valentine, his wife and three sons with a crew of ten for fishing in Alaska and British Columbia returning with a stop in Victoria, British Columbia in August. Valentine stated he planned to repeat the trip the next year.

War service
The Navy acquired Volador from W. L. Valentine on 2 February 1942 and placed the vessel in service on 19 February 1942 as a miscellaneous auxiliary vessel designated as IX-59 with the Port Director, San Pedro, California. The vessel operated locally within the 11th Naval District until July 1943 when she was temporarily transferred to the Coast Guard for operational training of Coast Guard district personnel. On 17 August 1943, Volador was delivered to the War Shipping Administration and struck from the Navy List on 3 September 1943.

The War Shipping Administration transferred the schooner to the War Department for operation by the US Army as a communications ship in the Southwest Pacific Area (SWPA). Volador was a part of the "CP fleet", a flotilla of small vessels equipped with radio and Signal Corps personnel first acting as relays from forward areas that expanded into full forward command post communications facilities. Volador participated in the Papua-New Guinea campaign along with the Australian acquired vessels Harold and Argosy Lemal and Geoanna, another US vessel sent to SWPA and used as a communications ship. In addition to standard CP fleet duties Volador became a radio repair ship "to supply floating maintenance wherever most required."

Post war
Volador departed Manila on 28 January 1950 for Hong Kong with owner George B. Ross, his eleven year old son and a crew of eleven. The U.S. 13th air force searched for the overdue yacht in February, unsuccessfully, as the yacht had put into Kwangchow-wan (Guangzhouwan), also noted as Fort-Bayard in reports,  after weather and other problems caused Ross to head for what he thought was still territory under French concession. On arrival the yacht was boarded by heavily armed Chinese Communist and interned along with the crew accused of spying. Ross and crew, less one crew member accidentally drowned during captivity, were eventually pushed across the border into Hong Kong dirty and penniless after sixty-four days in detention. Ross chartered the tug Alicia Moiler to reclaim the yacht itself but the crew had obtained a court order in Hong Kong impounding the vessel against a claim for back pay.

References

Further reading

External links
 

1926 ships
Ships built in Los Angeles
South West Pacific theatre of World War II
Unclassified miscellaneous vessels of the United States Navy
Ships of the United States Army